William Murphy (c. 1880–c. 1957) was a rugby union player who represented Australia.

Murphy, a number eight, claimed 1 international rugby cap for Australia. His brother Pat was also an Australian rugby union representative player.

References

                   

Australian rugby union players
Australia international rugby union players
Year of birth uncertain
Rugby union number eights